Oramir Semiconductor Equipment Ltd.  is an Israeli company that develops advanced laser cleaning technologies for semiconductor wafers, used during their manufacturing process. Oramir is located in Rehovot, Israel.

History
Oramir was founded in 1992 by Fairchild Corporation, Teuza Venture Capital Fund and Rafael Development Corporation of Israel. Oramir was named after Amir Sinai who was killed in service as an IDF special unit NCO in July 1984, during the war in Lebanon. Dan Sinai, Amir's father, was one of Oramir's founders.

Oramir’s notability derives from developing the advanced technology for cleaning silicon wafers in a one step dry process. Particles and other contaminants can be removed from a silicon substrate by a patented laser based technology. Applied Materials Inc. (NASDAQ: AMAT), a semiconductor equipment manufacturer, acquired Oramir for $21 million on June 27, 2001.

See also
 Applied Materials Inc.
 Silicon Wadi

References

External links 
 www.appliedmaterials.com

Semiconductor device fabrication
Equipment semiconductor companies
Semiconductor companies of Israel
Mergers and acquisitions of Israeli companies
2001 mergers and acquisitions